Club River Plate Asunción, mostly known simply as River Plate, is a Paraguayan football club from the neighbourhood of Mburicaó, in Asunción; founded in 1911. The club has been playing in the lower divisions of the Paraguayan league for several decades and their most notable achievements are the three second-place finishes they achieved when they were playing in the first division.

History
In 2015, River Plate were crowned champions on the División Intermedia and were promoted to the Primera División Paraguaya for the 2016 season.

Current squad

Notable players
To appear in this section a player must have either:
 Played at least 125 games for the club.
 Set a club record or won an individual award while at the club.
 Been part of a national team at any time.
 Played in the first division of any other football association (outside of Paraguay).
 Played in a continental and/or intercontinental competition.

 Diego Florentín (1930)
 Amadeo Ortega (1930)
 José Cardozo (1988–1990)
  Andre Galiassi (2003–2004)
  Fernando Sanjurjo (2004)
Non-CONMEBOL players
 Takuma Sugano (2002–2005)
 Alfredo Juraidini (2016)
 Hee-Mang Jang (2019–)

Honours
Paraguayan First Division: 0
Runners-up (3): 1919, 1926, 1930

Paraguayan Second Division: 3
1913, 1957, 2018

Paraguayan Third Division: 1
2010

References

External links
 Albigol: River Plate Info
 Paraguayan Soccer Info

Football clubs in Paraguay
Football clubs in Asunción
Association football clubs established in 1911
1911 establishments in Paraguay